Pedro Segundo Mardones Lemebel (21 November 1952 – 23 January 2015) was an openly gay Chilean essayist, chronicler, performer and novelist.  He was known for his cutting critique of authoritarianism and for his humorous depiction of Chilean popular culture, from a queer perspective. He was nominated for Chile's National Literature Prize in 2014. He died of laryngeal cancer on 23 January 2015 in Santiago, Chile.

Life

Early career
Lemebel was born in El Zanjón de la Aguada, a poor neighborhood in Santiago on the banks of Zanjón de la Aguada, an irrigation canal that flows into the Mapocho river; to the family of Pedro Mardones Paredes and Violeta Lemebel. In the late 1980s, he chose to be identified by his mother's surname, Lemebel, as his choice for surname instead of his father's (Mardones), as is the norm in most Latin American countries. He attended an industrial school of carpentry and metal forging at the Industrial de Hombres de La Legua High School and later studied plastic art at University of Chile's Art School. He subsequently became a high school art teacher but was let go based on the presumption of his homosexuality.

Lemebel attended writing workshops to hone his skills and network with other writers, his first writing recognition was in 1982, when he won an award for his short story, Porque el tiempo está cerca. In 1986, he published as his first major work, the book Incontables, a compilation of short stories under the feminist publication label, Ergo Sum. A year later, he co-founded a performance collective that used the tactics of intervention and disruption of events to raise public consciousness about the struggles of minorities in Chile. The disruption and performances of the collective brought Lemebel into public limelight in Chile. In 1986, he disrupted a meeting of Chile's left wing groups opposed to Augusto Pinochet's dictatorship. He entered the meeting in high heels and with makeup on his face depicting an hammer and sickle extending from his mouth to his left eyebrow. At the event, he spoke about his manifesto, ‘Manifest: I Speak for my Difference’ criticizing homophobia in left wing politics.

Lemebel was widely known as a communist. Being distant from the Communist Party, he was a close friend of its leader, Gladys Marín, until her death in 2005.

Yeguas del Apocalipsis
In 1987, Lemebel co-founded a group with Francisco Casas, poet, artist and student of literature. The duo called the group "The Mares of the Apocalypse,"or "Yeguas del Apocalipsis," a reference to the biblical "Horsemen of the Apocalypse" that appear in the New Testament. This performing duo made appearances sabotaging book launches, art expositions and even political discussions. Their appearances were usually surprising, provocative and demonstrated an aspect of counter culture.

Around this time he decided to abandon his paternal last name, Mardones, and begin using that of his mother, Lemebel. In an interview the writer would explain his choice of name change as the following,
"Lemebel is a gesture of femininity, to engrave a maternal last name, to acknowledge my (washer) mother in light of the illegality of homosexual(s) and transvestite(s)."

The first intervention/performance of "The Mares of the Apocalypse" was the afternoon of October 22, 1988, during the second installment of the Pablo Neruda prize to poet Raúl Zurita in La Chascona. In the middle of the ceremony, Lemebel and Casas appeared offering Zurita a crown of thorns that the poet did not accept.

In 1989, both Lemebel and Casas recreated a series of vignettes under the direction of Mario Vivado. The portraits later became part of an exhibition at the D12 Gallery in Chile. Casas and Lemebel posed as Buster Keaton, Marilyn Monroe, the sisters from Garcia Lorca's La Casa de Bernarda Alba and other icons of the Chilean gay community. In the 1990s, Lemebel returned to writing and published a string of urban chronicles.

The next year they appeared in the Cariola theater during a meeting of intellectuals with presidential candidate Patricio Aylwin, whom the following year would be elected the first president of Chile after the restoration of democracy and the end of the dictatorship. Although uninvited, Lemebel and Casas arrived wearing heels and feathers bearing a sign that said "Homosexuals for change." In addition to that, Casas rushed over to, at the time candidate for senator and future Chilean president, Ricardo Lagos and kissed him on the mouth. A photograph of this event was included years later in his book Háblame de Amores(2012).

Both writers often turned into agents of their own text and created an interpretation from homosexual reality and an interruption of institutional discussions during the age of the dictator. Their work crossed over into performances, transvestism, photography, video and various art installations. With these they would advocate for a place for memory, human rights and sexuality in democratic talks. "Maybe the first experiment with plastic, the action of art...was decisive in the move from story to chronicle. It's possible that this corporal exposition in a religious frame was evaporating the generic form of the story...the timeless story to make for oneself and urgent chronicle..." explained Lemebel.

In 1994, Lemebel participated in the stonewall festival in New York, an LGBT pride festival.

In between 1987 and 1995, "The Mares of the Apocalypse" carried out at lease fifteen public interventions and in total no more than twenty. The majority of these events were in Santiago but some were also in Concepción, Chile. Some of their public demonstrations included dancing the Cueca on broken glass, dressing up as Frida Kahlo and they even dressed up as Lady Godiva and rode around naked on white horses for the art department at the university of Chile.

In 1995, Lemebel published (in addition to his first book titled La Esquina es mi corazón) his first collection of Chronicles some of which had their first appearances in newspapers and magazines titled "Página Abierta," "Punto Final," and "La Nación." In these chronicles Lemebel referenced the many marginalized setting of Santiago which he linked to themes of homosexuality, prostitution and poverty, some of which were taboo to talk about at the time. The following year he created the program "Cancionero" for the radio show "Radio Tierra." In this program he would read his chronicles accompanied by sounds or even music. That same year he published "Loco afán: Crónicas de si dario," his second book of chronicles that spoke about themes like AIDS and the marginalization of transvestites.

In 1997, in some of their final appearances "The Mares of the Apocalypse" were invited to Bienal de la Habana, in Habana Cuba. In 1998 he published his third book of chronicles titled "De Perlas y Cicatrizes" which was composed mostly of the stories he told on the radio program. After the arrest of Augusto Pinochet in a London hospital, he created "The Clinic" whose editor Patricio Ferrández he asked to leave everything in it uncensored.

Urban chronicles and other writings

Earlier in his career, Lemebel had attended workshops of the Society of Chilean Writers and gained the friendship of some feminist writers such as Pía Barros who later helped published his first book, Incontables. He returned to writing in the 1990s starting with series of urban chronicles that was published in Chilean newspapers, magazines and read on the radio. In 1995 and 1996, Lemebel wrote two books in a chronicle and hybrid literary style, a combination of reportage, memoir, public address, fiction and socio-political historical analysis. In 1995, he published La Esquina es mi corazón: Crónica urbana (The Corner is My Heart), writing about Chilean history from the perspectives of young adults raised in poor neighborhoods and those who are stigmatized socially. In 1996, he published Loco afán: Crónicas de sidario (Mad Urge: AIDS Chronicles), a piece of 31 short texts and images that detailed the journey of a group of marginalized gay youths in Chile through the period of dictatorship to the outbreak of AIDS. Lemebel was given a Guggenheim Foundation scholarship in 1999 for his literary accomplishments leading to increase appearances in forums and seminars in Chile and US.

He gained international recognition with his novel Tengo miedo torero which was the first book translated into English.  In 2013, he was given the José Donoso Award. He died of laryngeal cancer in January 2015.

International recognition

In 1999, thanks to the influences of his friend, Chilean writer Roberto Bolaño, who had immigrated to Europe from Mexico in 1977 and has since lived in Spain, his book Loco Afán: Crónicas de Sidario was published for the editorial "Barcelonesa Anagrama," becoming his first work in the foreigner. Since then, his written work began to attract the interest in various universities and international educational institutions.

That same year he also participated in Festival of Guadalajara, Mexico, in replacement of Bolaño who had rejected the offer, and accepted praise for his work of the famous write Carlos Monsiváis.

In 2001 he published his first novel Tengo miedo torero a difficult story of contextualized love during the attempt on the life of Augusto Pinochet (September 7, 1986). For the presentation of the book, Lemebel arrived in a red dress with a feathered headdress, at a ceremony with many people that was public with politicians, filmmakers, journalists and a few writers. The book would later gain international recognition after being translated into English by Katherine Silver, then French and Italian.

In 2003 he continued his work as a journalist, publishing his anthology of Chronicles Zanjón de la Aguada, that spoke of the gay community in neighborhoods of distinctive social classes in Santiago and where appeared some real people like the social leader and president of the Agrupación de Familiares de Detenidos Desaparecidos (AFDD) Sola Sierra. This work was followed a year later by Adios Mariquita Linda, another anthology of chronicles that maintained the same tendencies of his previous works.

In 2008 his sixth book of chronicles appeared, titled Serenata Carfiola.

On November 29, 2012, Lemebel participated in the "Feria del Libro de Guadalajara," publishing his new book of chronicles, titled Háblame de amores, showing a dramatization of his work "Susurrucucu Paloma."

On September 4, 2013, Lemebel was awarded the "Premio José Donoso," which he dedicated to his mother, the deceased Gladys Marín, and his readers belonging to the working class.

List of works
 La esquina es mi corazón.
 Loco afán: Crónicas de sidario (chronicles). Santiago: LOM, 1996.
 De perlas y cicatrices (chronicles). Santiago: LOM, 1998.
 Tengo miedo torero (novel). Santiago: Grupo Editorial Planeta, 2001. (translated as My Tender Matador by Katherine Silver, published by Grove in 2005)
 La esquina es mi corazón (chronicles). Santiago: Seix Barral, 2001.
 Zanjón de la Aguada. Santiago: Seix Barral, 2003.
 Adiós, mariquita linda.
 Serenata cafiola.
 Háblame de amores.
 Poco hombre.
 Mi amiga Gladys.
 Tengo miedo torero (script), 2015. (translated as My tender Matador for the film based on his homonymous novel)

Unedited works and posthumous publications

In an interview in 2013, during the publication of the anthology Poco Hombre , Pedro Lemebel announced he was working on two literary projects that would soon see the light and then, after his death, they were truncated: one of them is Mi Amiga Gladys, a book of chronicles about Gladys Marín, leader and representative of the Communist Party of Chile and was deceased in 2005.

Josephina Alemparte, editor of Seal Planet, declared that the book was going to be presented in the book fair of Santiago but for health reasons this was postponed. Finally, the Planet editorial published the book the second of November in the year 2016. At the end of the same month they published Arder, a book that is compiled of images of the homonymous exposure and that extensively gathered his audio visual work.

Likewise he also announced the publication of a box set of all his books since La Esquina es mi corazón (1995) and until Háblame de Armores (2012) (possibly including Mi Amiga Gladys, 2016) and a documentary addressed to Joanna Reposi, that contains seven years of records.

Another book that was found was titled El éxtasis de delinquir, that would be his second book since Tengo miedo torero (2001). This work centers in the history of Patricio Egaña, who provided drugs to Claudio Spiniak. Since the year 2011 he began to mention in interviews that he was writing a new novel intended for release in 2016 or 2017 to be published by the Planet editorial.

Awards and prizes 
 1983: First Prize in the Contest of the Compensation Fund of Javier Carrera for "Porque el tiempo está cerca"
 1999: Guggenheim Fellowship
 2002: Nominated for the Altazor Award for "Tengo miedo torero"
 2004: Nominated for the Altazor Award for "Zanjón de la Aguada"
 2006: Nominated for the Altazor Award in Literary Essay for "Adiós, mariquita linda"
 2006: Anna Seghers-Preis
 2006: Nominated for the Altazor Award for the theatrical version of "Tengo miedo torero"
 2013: Nominated for the Altazor Award in Essays and Memoirs for "Háblame de amores"
 2013: :es:Premio José Donoso
 2014: Nominated for the Altazor Award in Essays and Memoirs for "Poco hombre"
 2014: Nominated for the Chilean National Prize for Literature

Style
In his works, Lemebel addresses Chilean Marginalization with some autobiographical references. With a poetic prose that is at the same time self-deprecating, consequential, refers to an "other", irreverent, over elaborate and corny, he mixes reality with fiction, which he uses to denounce the "silicone" parts of his works. His works are usually tragic-comedies and aggressive, in constant rejection of right wing politics and the Chilean upper class.

Mexican writer Carlos Monsiváis associates his aesthetic criticisms with those of Néstor Perlongher, Joaquín Hurtado and to a lesser extent with Reinaldo Arenas, Severo Sarduy and Manuel Puig; with the first three, for their "vindicating anger", with Sarduy for his "radical experimentation" and with Puig for his "witty incorporation and victory of proscribed sensitivity." For Monsiváis, Lemebel and all these authors, homosexuality is not an artistic identity so much as a literary attitude. Perlongher too shares a style of baroque or over elaborate writing, but Lemebel does not look to confuse anyone. In his related Chronicles about AIDS, he employs a modernist and postmodernist view that is similar to Julián del Casal, Amado Nervo and Enrique Gómez Carrillo.

Death
Pedro Lemebel died on January 23, 2015, in Santiago, Chile, of laryngeal cancer. Once the news went around of his death, countless newspapers paid tribute and condolences. He was well-known and recognized for his extravagant personality and for referring to himself as a "queen." Hundreds of people from all walks of life attended his funeral service, from celebrities to politicians. His extensive efforts in breaking the norm through his unique self-expression in his written works and activism have left a lasting impact on society and are part of his legacy. His remains are buried in the Metropolitan Cemetery of Santiago.

Influence and legacy

Pedro Lemebel is well known for his influence in the fight for homosexual rights, his work as a writer, and his strong political side. Lemebel was much more than a writer; he was a free man, an artist, a political and popular icon, but more than anything a rebel and a voice for the homosexual community.

Lemebel was born as Pedro Mardones Lemebel, but when he decided to take the last name of his mother, was the first big political decision that reaffirmed his commitment towards his homosexual side, a side that was later incorporated into his literary works. Lemebel was able to envisage a hidden reality of homosexuals; he was able to unmask the violence of which homosexuals were victims in Chile. The importance of Pedro Lemebel is not only value for his talent as a writer, but also as a person full of defiance in a conservative and machista country. Óscar Contardo describes Lemebel as a “popular figure: a figure that is supposed to be disgusted in our society, which is the "loca" (queen), he managed to make that figure as the center, and then transform it into a popular icon."

Although Lemebel was never a formal militant, he was a follower of PC (partido comunista/Communist party). Until his death, Lemebel work in his book that revealed his friendship with the deceased Gladys Marin, titled "Mi querida Gladys." Daniel Alcaíno, friend of Lemebel, believes that beyond politics, Lemebel's legacy was other. “Beyond the left wing and politics, he was an institution. Pedro was heavily connected with the color red, but not with the red of the political party, but with the red of blood. Blood of the humble and simple people. That is what he is remember for.”

He was profiled in the 2019 documentary film Lemebel, by filmmaker Joanna Reposi Garibaldi.

Notes

Further reading
 Farewell Sweet Ladybird: A Manifesto and Three Chronicles by Pedro Lemebel (1952–2015) Cordite Poetry Review
Henri Billard, "Amour et culture populaire: armes de lutte politique dans le roman Je tremble, Ô Matador de Pedro Lemebel". Entre jouissance et tabous, les représentations des relations amoureuses et des sexualités dans les Amériques, sous la direction de Mariannick Guennec, Rennes, Presses Universitaires de Rennes, 2015, pp. 125–132
Henri Billard, "Y la mariquita le dijo al torero... Pedro Lemebel, figura de resistancia cultural", L'écriture de Pedro Lemebel, Nouvelles pratiques identitaires et scripturale, sous la direction de María A. Semilla Durán, Publications de l'université de Saint-Etienne, Saint-Etienne, 2012, pp. 15–25.
Henri Billard, "Las cicatrices del margen: resistencia cultural y lucha identitaria en las crónicas urbanas de Pedro Lemebel", Éste que ves, engaño colorido, Literarias, culturas y sujetos alternos en América Latina, sous la direction de Chiara Bolognese, Fernanda Bustamante, Mauricio Zabalgoitia, Icaria, Barcelona, 2012, pp. 311–318.
Henri Billard, "La pluma entre las plumas: La presencia de los pájaros en las crónicas urbanas de Pedro Lemebel", Confluencia -  Revista Hispanica de Cultura y Literatura, Fall 2012, Volume 28, Number 1, University of Northern Colorado, Greeley, USA, 2012, p. 14-19
Henri Billard, "Los tajos del «cuerpo deseante» en Loco afán. Crónicas de sidario de Pedro Lemebel", Recherches, numéro 04, printemps 2010, pp. 39–48.
 Fernando A. Blanco (ed.), Reinas de otro cielo: Modernidad y autoritarismo en la obra de Pedro Lemebel.  Santiago de Chile: LOM, 2004.
 Fernando A. Blanco y Juan Poblete (eds.) Desdén al Infortunio. Sujeto, narración y público en la narrativa de Pedro Lemebel. Santiago de Chile: Cuarto Propio, 2010. 
 Diana Palaversich, translated by Paul Allatson "The Wounded Body of Proletarian Homosexuality in Pedro Lemebel's Loco afan" Latin American Perspectives 29.2 (March 2002): 99-118.
 Desdén al Infortunio. Sujeto, comunicación y público en la narrativa de Pedro Lemebel (Eds.) Blanco, Fernando A. y Poblete, Juan. 2010, Cuarto Propio: Santiago de Chile.

External links

 Website devoted to Lemebel with biography etc. 

1952 births
2015 deaths
Chilean LGBT rights activists
20th-century Chilean novelists
Chilean essayists
Chilean atheists
Gay novelists
Chilean LGBT novelists
Chilean gay writers
Chilean communists
Deaths from laryngeal cancer
Deaths from cancer in Chile
Male essayists
21st-century Chilean novelists
Chilean male novelists
Writers from Santiago
20th-century essayists
20th-century Chilean male writers
21st-century Chilean male writers